WKNV is a Southern Gospel formatted broadcast radio station licensed to Fairlawn, Virginia, serving Blacksburg and Christiansburg in Virginia.  WKNV is owned and operated by Baker Family Stations.

References

External links

1998 establishments in Virginia
Southern Gospel radio stations in the United States
Radio stations established in 1998
KNV
KNV